5-MeO-NMT (5-methoxy-N-methyltryptamine) is an organic chemical compound, being the 5-methoxy analog of N-methyltryptamine (NMT). It was first isolated from Phalaris arundinacea (reed canary grass). It has also been synthesized by Alexander Shulgin and reported in his book TiHKAL. Like other members of the N-methyltryptamine family of compounds, 5-MeO-NMT is believed to produce few or no psychedelic effects, although very little data exists about its pharmacological properties or toxicity.

Legal Status

In the U.S. this substance is a schedule 1 isomer of Bufotenin.

See also 
 Tryptamine
 Dimethyltryptamine
 Psychedelics, dissociatives and deliriants

References

Tryptamines